The denar (paucal: denari / денари; abbreviation: ден (Cyrillic) or DEN (Latin), ISO code: MKD) is the currency of North Macedonia. Though subdivided into one hundred deni, coins with a denomination of less than one denar have not been in use since 2013.

History
The first denar was established as a temporary currency on 26 April 1992  in the then-Republic of Macedonia, replacing the 1990 version of the Yugoslav dinar at a 1:1 parity. In May 1993, the currency was reformed and a new denar was introduced, with one new denar being equal to 100 old denars.

Etymology
The name denar comes from the name of the ancient Roman monetary unit, the denarius. The abbreviation is ден, the first three Cyrillic letters of its name.

First denar (1992–1993)
The first denar was a temporary currency introduced on 26 April 1992 to replace the Yugoslav dinar at 1:1 parity and establish the monetary independence of Macedonia.

History
Macedonia declared independence from Yugoslavia on 8 September 1991. At the time, the country was using the Yugoslav dinar. But secret preparations were begun to introduce its own currency, and by April 1992, Macedonia was ready to acquire monetary independence from Yugoslavia. On 26 April, the National Bank of Macedonia was established and the denar declared the national currency. Notes in the form of "value coupons" entered circulation the following day, and on 30 April 1992, the Yugoslav dinar ceased to be legal tender. In May 1993, the first denar was replaced at a rate of 100 to 1 by a new, permanent denar consisting of notes and coins.

Coins
No coins were issued for the first denar.

Banknotes
Temporary notes ("value coupons") were introduced on 27 April 1992, although preparations for producing them began much earlier. The notes remained in circulation until they were replaced by permanent notes of the second denar in 1993.

Production
Printing of the notes started on 15 January 1992 at the “11 October” printing firm in Prilep. The difficulties of creating a new currency in secret were reflected in the notes themselves. The paper, purchased from Slovenia, proved to be of poor quality and lacked adequate security. Although denominated in denari, the name of the currency did not appear on the notes because they were printed prior to the adoption of the Law on the Monetary Unit. Likewise, the issuer appeared as the National Bank of Republic of Macedonia, not its successor, the National Bank of the Republic of Macedonia.

Design
The notes were designed by a young employee of the "11 October" printer, who had only one week and a limited budget to design them. Thus the six lowest denominations were identical, with the exception of their colours. All featured a man and two women picking tobacco leaves on the front, with the back devoted to the Ilinden monument in Kruševo, which, according to the bank, “expresses the eternal fight of citizens of Macedonia for life in peace and freedom.”

Exchange rates
The denar was introduced with a fixed exchange rate of 360 denars to the Deutsche Mark.

Second denar (1993–present)

Coins

First series (1993)
In May 1993, coins for the second denar were introduced in denominations of 50 deni, and 1, 2, and 5 denars. The coins were designed by Dimče Boškoski and Snežana Atanasovska. In November 2008, 10 and 50 denar coins were introduced, while the 50 deni coin was withdrawn in 2013. Due to its low mintage, it had only been struck in 1993 and was practically never seen in circulation.

Since 1996, a large number of commemorative coins have been issued for collectors; a listing can be found on the national bank website.

Coins are minted at the Suvenir factory in Samokov, a village near Makedonski Brod.

Second series (2020)
Due to the country's name change as part of the Prespa Agreement, a new set of coins featuring the new name of North Macedonia is being released into circulation, starting with 1 denar coins in April 2021.

FAO coinage (1995)
In 1995, circulation coins of 1, 2, and 5 denar denominations were struck in honor of the United Nations' Food and Agriculture Organization.

Banknotes
In 1993, the new denar was issued in denominations of 10, 20, 50, 100, and 500 denar notes. The 20 denar note was only issued in this first series. In 1996, 1000 and 5000 denar notes were added. In 2016, notes of 200 and 2,000 denars were issued, while the national bank began withdrawing the 5000 denar banknote from circulation to re-balance the structure of notes in circulation. In 2017, the national bank unveiled its current polymer banknotes, the 10 and 50 denar notes, and put them into circulation on May 15.

Exchange rates

See also 

 Economy of North Macedonia
 Denarius

References

External links 
 Ministry of Finance website
 

Currencies of North Macedonia
Currencies introduced in 1992
Currencies introduced in 1993
Currency symbols